Roy Clarence William Watson (21 June 1933 – 10 April 2020) was an Australian cricketer. He played seven first-class matches for Western Australia between 1957-58 and 1958-59. A wicket-keeper, in Western Australia's 89-run victory over South Australia in the 1957-58 Sheffield Shield he took seven catches and made 28 not out and 21 not out.

References

External links
 

1933 births
2020 deaths
Cricketers from Perth, Western Australia
Australian cricketers
Western Australia cricketers